China Cargo Airlines sometimes as abbreviated 中货航 (in English as CCA) is a cargo airline with its head office on Hongqiao International Airport in Shanghai, People's Republic of China. It is China's first all-cargo airline operating dedicated freight services using China Eastern Airlines route structure. Its base is at Shanghai Hongqiao International Airport, with a hub at Shanghai Pudong International Airport.

History

The airline was established on 30 July 1998 and started operations in October 1998. It was founded as, and remains, a joint venture between China Eastern Airlines (70%) and China Ocean Shipping (30%). It briefly adopted the title China Eastern Airlines Cargo, and reverted to its original name again after becoming an independent subsidiary in 2004.

Its parent company China Eastern Airlines reached agreement to inject more capital into the cargo airline. Its stake fell from 70 percent to just over 51 percent. China Ocean Shipping's share reduced to 17 percent. This allowed Singapore Airlines Cargo to invest up to 16 percent of the cargo airline. EVA Air also purchased a 16 percent share of the airline.

In 2011, China Cargo Airlines merged operations with Great Wall Airlines and Shanghai Airlines Cargo. The two airlines were rebranded as China Cargo Airlines progressively.

Destinations

Fleet

Current fleet

, China Cargo Airlines fleet consists of the following aircraft:

Former fleet

See also 
 China Eastern Airlines
 Shanghai Airlines Cargo
 Great Wall Airlines

References

External links 

 China Cargo Airlines
 China Cargo Airlines 

Cargo airlines of China
Airlines of China
Chinese companies established in 1998
Airlines established in 1998
Companies based in Shanghai
China Eastern Airlines
COSCO Shipping